The Women's 100 metre backstroke competition at the 2022 World Aquatics Championships was held on 19 and 20 June 2022.

Records
Prior to the competition, the existing world and championship records were as follows.

Results

Heats
The heats were started on 19 June at 09:00.

Semifinals
The semifinals were started on 19 June at 18:56.

Final
The final was held on 20 June at 18:51.

References

Women's 100 metre backstroke